Kampong Kiudang is a village in Tutong District, Brunei, about  from the district town Pekan Tutong. The population was 1,258 in 2016.

Administration 
The village is one of the subdivisions within Mukim Kiudang, a mukim in the district. Its village head also oversees the neighbouring village Kampong Mungkom.

Facilities 
Kiudang Primary School is the village primary school; it was opened in 1938. It also shares grounds with Kiudang Religious School, the village school for the country's Islamic religious primary education.

Pengiran Muda 'Abdul Wakeel Mosque (also known as Kampong Kiudang Mosque) is the village mosque; the current building was opened in December 2010 and can accommodate about 1,200 worshippers. The mosque's older building accommodated 300 worshippers and had been inaugurated on 26 December 1972.

Achievement 
The village has received a few awards and recognition, both on national and regional levels. In 2013, it won a bronze medal in the Excellent Village Award, an annual national award which recognises villages with outstanding community-led socioeconomic activities. In 2015, the village was designated as a community-based Eco-tourism Village by BIMP-EAGA, a sub-ASEAN economic cooperation initiative. In 2017, the village was a recipient of the ASEAN Community-based Tourism Award for its achievement in attracting visitors, both local and foreign, to the village.

References 

Kiudang